Greenville is a historic plantation home located near Raccoon's Ford, Culpeper County, Virginia. Building of the property commenced in 1847 and was completed in 1854. It is a three-story, central-hall plan Classical Revival style brick dwelling. It measures 54 feet by 38 feet, 8 inches, and has a low pitched, "W"-shaped, ridge-and-valley roof. The front facade features a three-story portico with Tuscan order, stuccoed brick columns.  Also on the property is a contributing outbuilding.

It was listed on the National Register of Historic Places in 1980.

References

Houses on the National Register of Historic Places in Virginia
Neoclassical architecture in Virginia
Houses completed in 1854
Houses in Culpeper County, Virginia
National Register of Historic Places in Culpeper County, Virginia